Luke and Brian Comer are Irish billionaire property developers and the founders and owners of the Comer Group, a privately owned UK property development company.

Early life
The Comer brothers come from Glenamaddy, Co Galway, in Ireland.

Career
They left school in their teens to work as plasterers. They moved to London in 1984, working first as plasterers and then moving into property development. Since then their focus has shifted to Germany and then to Ireland in 2010, in their quest for value-for-money.

The brothers' notable projects include the conversion of the listed Friern Hospital (formerly Colney Hatch Lunatic Asylum) to residential accommodation in the mid-1990s as Princess Park Manor.

The Comers invested more than €75 million in property purchases in Ireland, the UK, and Germany within just six months (November 2015-April 2016) and reported plans to invest an additional €200 million in the 18 months to follow. In 2017, two farmers in Ireland filed suit against the brothers over land rights to five acres of grazing territory in north county Dublin.

In 2018, the Comers purchased Kilmartin House, a 111 acres piece of land in Dublin 15. The land will be used for a residential development.  In May 2018 it was reported that the Beckett Building, which was purchased by the Comer Brothers in 2013 for roughly €5 million,  was sold to Kookman Bank for €101 million.

Personal life
They are residents in Monaco for tax purposes. Luke Comer is a keen horse-breeder.

According to the Sunday Times Rich List in 2021, the brothers had a net worth of £906 million.

References

Living people
Irish billionaires
Real estate and property developers
Irish expatriates in Monaco
People from County Galway
Sibling duos
Year of birth missing (living people)
Irish businesspeople in real estate